Crooked Man may refer to:

Film and television
The Crooked Man (2003 film), a 2003 British television movie starring Ross Kemp
"The Crooked Man", an episode of The Adventures of Sherlock Holmes television series
The Crooked Man, an episode of the animated show Sherlock Holmes in the 22nd Century
"The Crooked Man", an episode of the television series The Adventures of Ellery Queen
The Crooked Man, the main villain in the Netflix web television series Raising Dion

Literature
"The Crooked Man", an alternate title of "The Adventure of the Crooked Man", a Sherlock Holmes short story
A Crooked Man, a novel by Christopher Lehmann-Haupt 
"The Crooked Man", a Melinda Snodgrass short story in the anthology Card Sharks
"The Crooked Man", a Charles Beaumont short story

Music
"The Crooked Man", a song from Western Approaches (album)
"Crooked Man", a song by Show of Hands from the album As You Were

Other uses
The Crooked Man, a limited series from Hellboy: The Crooked Man and Others
Crooked Man, a 2011 international stand-up tour by Tommy Tiernan
The Crooked Man and The Crooked Cat, a 2013 Hidden Object computer game created by Blue Tea Games

See also
There Was a Crooked Man (disambiguation)